Main Beach (originally Southport East) is a coastal town and suburb in the City of Gold Coast, Queensland, Australia.

Geography

Historically, the Main Beach area was a narrow strip of coastal sand dunes separating the mouth of the Nerang River from the Coral Sea. Narrow Neck formed the southern boundary and to the north was a long sand spit terminated by the bar between the Broadwater and the sea. This created a natural basin for boats at the mouth of the river protected from the sea by the Main Beach area.

As at 2021, the suburb of Main Beach is bounded to the east by the Coral Sea, to the north by the Gold Coast Seaway, to the west by Labrador Channel and South Channel, and Macintosh Island, and to the south by Narrow Neck.

History
During the early years in which Southport was the urban centre of recreational activity at the coast, visitors were ferried across the Broadwater to surf at the Main Beach so named because it was the main surf beach for the town of Southport.

Until the 1870s and 1880s the only activity in the sand spit at the northern end were limited to facilities associated with the Southport Yacht Club and other maritime activities.

The construction of the Jubilee Bridge led to land sales in the area. The Queensland Government surveyed 252 blocks of land for perpetual land leases which it sold in stages from December 1922. The area became more popular following the opening of the bridge in 1926, when land was purchased and holiday houses were constructed. Some guest houses were also constructed but little or no permanent population was located in the area. Some evidence remains of the area's early popularity as a surfing beach in the beachfront planting and the kiosk and shelter shed from 1934.

In the 1950s, reclamation of the Nerang River to the west of the earlier subdivision created the area centred on Tedder Avenue. A different subdivision pattern in that portion of Main Beach is the result. 

The construction of the Sundale Bridge and the deviation of highway to the west of Main Beach took place in the late 1960s.

Similarly the land to the north of the early subdivision - the sand spit that formed one bank of the bar - was only recently developed.  Its use is still limited to resort hotels and theme parks now occupy the land. Revegetation of the Southport Spit followed the construction of the Gold Coast Seaway and gives particular character to this area and acts to link the more intensively developed area to the south with the open areas of the Broadwater and Southern Moreton Bay.

Main Beach property has developed as a high rise area only relatively recently and is focused on the eTedder Avenue which features restaurants, cafes, and boutiques. It has a sense of more permanent residential neighbourhood than other parts of the high-rise coastal strip. Most of the apartment buildings along the foreshore are more modest in scale. The isthmus at Narrowneck acts as a natural barrier to the more intensively developed area to the south.  The Gold Coast Oceanway travels on the seaward side of the Southport SLSC but then diverts inland to travel behind beachfront houses of Main Beach down to Narrowneck. Some local residents would like a new Oceanway pavement constructed along the road reserve between the beachfront houses and the dune area.

A large number of Norfolk Island Pines (Araucaria heterophylla), a conifer that is not native to the area, have been planted on the Main Beach foreshore.

On 1 September 1967, the town of Southport East was officially renamed Main Beach.

The next most common countries of birth were New Zealand 5.6% and England 5.3%. 75.6% of people spoke only English at home. The most common responses for religion were No Religion 26.9%, Catholic 23.3% and Anglican 18.1%.

Heritage listings 

Main Beach has a number of heritage-listed sites, including:
 off Macarthur Parade: Main Beach Pavilion and Southport Surf Lifesaving Club
 Main Beach Parade: the former Southport Cable Hut
 Seaworld Drive: Humphreys Boat Shed

References

Sources

External links

 
 
Main Beach Progress Association Official site

 
Suburbs of the Gold Coast, Queensland
Coastline of Queensland